Annatherapsidus is an extinct genus of therocephalians. It was a fairly small animal with a length of 91 cm and a 22 cm skull.

See also
 List of therapsids

References

Prehistoric synapsids of Europe
Akidnognathids
Fossil taxa described in 1961
Taxa named by Oskar Kuhn
Therocephalia genera